King of Cups is a card used in suited playing cards which include tarot decks. It is part of what esotericists call the Minor Arcana. Tarot cards are used throughout much of Europe to play Tarot card games.

In English-speaking countries, where the game is really unknown, tarot cards came to be utilized primarily for divinatory purposes.

Divinatory usage
The King of Cups is depicted as a mature, fair-haired man, seated on a throne and holding a cup in his right hand and a sceptre in his left. Here is a man who is "all heart". The king of cups card usually depicts a mature man who appreciates the finer things in life such as music and art. He can be warm-hearted and kind. The image usually has some reference to the sea or water, water being the element connected with the suit of Cups. In the Rider–Waite deck, for example, the sea is pictured surrounding the throne, and a stylised dolphin and ship are depicted in the background to its side.

The divinatory message of the card is of a fair-haired man or one associated with Art or Law. It may also represent a man who is favourably disposed towards the querent or, in a more abstract sense, refer to the arts and sciences or any sphere which involves creative intelligence.

The personality of the King of Cups is a combination of the positive nurturing energy of water of the Cups suit and the active, outward focus of a King. The king of cups can be a wonderful guide and mentor as he is usually a giver of unselfish aid, albeit one who is easily angered. He cares about others sincerely and always responds to their needs with compassion. He heals with a gentle touch and a quiet word. He is usually tolerant of all points of view and shows patience in the most trying of circumstances.

The king of cups believes in using diplomacy rather than force, but can be tiresomely devious if you cross him, as he is usually big on emotionality. The king of cups almost always represents a good mentor for a querent who is actively involved in the creative arts.

References

Suit of Cups
Fictional kings